is a public school in Hitachinaka, Ibaraki Prefecture, Japan. It accommodates approximately 600 students that are in their final three years of education. It was built in 1973 to accommodate for the outburst of children needing education in Hitachinaka. It is regulated by the Ibaraki Prefecture council.

Katsuta High School has facilities such as computer labs, a library, a gymnasium and sports clubs.

Katsuta High School teaches English and other foreign studies.

External links
School website

High schools in Ibaraki Prefecture
Schools in Ibaraki Prefecture